Gülistan Yüksel (born 27 March 1962) is a German politician of the Social Democratic Party (SPD) who has been serving as a member of the Bundestag, the German parliament, since 2013.

Early life and professional career
Yüksel was born in Adana, Turkey. At the age of eight years, she moved to Mönchengladbach, Germany, and grew up in Rheydt. After vocational training as a pharmacy assistant, she worked in a pharmacy in Rheydt. Later, she became head of a taxi company.

Political career 
Yüksel became an SPD member in 1997. She was deputy chair of her local party organisation from 2005 to 2014 and chair since 2014. After serving on the Mönchengladbach city foreigner's council in the mid-1990s, she was a member of the city council for most of the time between 2002 to 2013. 

Yüksel became a member of the Bundestag in the 2013 elections and was reelected in 2017 as one of 14 members of the Bundestag with Turkish roots. In addition to her committee assignments, she has been a member of the German delegation to the Franco-German Parliamentary Assembly since 2019.

Within her parliamentary group, Yüksel belongs to the Parliamentary Left, a left-wing movement.

Recognition
Yüksel was awarded the Order of Merit of the Federal Republic of Germany in 2007 for her engagement for migrants.

Other activities
 Federal Agency for Civic Education (BPB), Member of the Board of Trustees (since 2022)

Personal life
Yüksel is married and has two children.

References

1962 births
People from Adana
People from Mönchengladbach
Members of the Bundestag for North Rhine-Westphalia
Recipients of the Cross of the Order of Merit of the Federal Republic of Germany
Living people
Turkish emigrants to West Germany
German politicians of Turkish descent
Naturalized citizens of Germany
Members of the Bundestag 2021–2025
Members of the Bundestag 2017–2021
Members of the Bundestag 2013–2017
Members of the Bundestag for the Social Democratic Party of Germany